This list contains all cultural property of national significance (class A) in the canton of Solothurn from the 2009 Swiss Inventory of Cultural Property of National and Regional Significance. It is sorted by municipality and contains 35 individual buildings, 9 collections and 17 archaeological finds.

The geographic coordinates provided are in the Swiss coordinate system as given in the Inventory.

Aeschi

Balm bei Günsberg

Balsthal

Beinwil

Bolken

Buchegg

Büren

Dornach

Eppenberg-Wöschnau

Erlinsbach

Feldbrunnen-St. Niklaus

Flumenthal

Grenchen

Himmelried

Hochwald

Holderbank

Laupersdorf

Lüsslingen-Nennigkofen

Meltingen

Messen

Metzerlen-Mariastein

Neuendorf

Niederbuchsiten

Niedergösgen

Oberbuchsiten

Oberdorf

Oensingen

Olten

Rodersdorf

Rüttenen

Schnottwil

Schönenwerd

Seewen

Selzach

Solothurn

Subingen

Trimbach

Winznau

References
 All entries, addresses and coordinates are from:

External links
 Swiss Inventory of Cultural Property of National and Regional Significance, 2009 edition:

PDF documents: Class B objects
Geographic information system